The women's high jump at the 1969 European Athletics Championships was held in Athens, Greece, at Georgios Karaiskakis Stadium on 16 and 18 September 1969.

Medalists

Results

Final
18 September

Qualification
16 September

Participation
According to an unofficial count, 23 athletes from 13 countries participated in the event.

 (1)
 (1)
 (3)
 (2)
 (2)
 (1)
 (2)
 (2)
 (1)
 (3)
 (1)
 (3)
 (1)

References

High jump
High jump at the European Athletics Championships
Euro